In physics, a perfect fluid is a fluid that can be completely characterized by its rest frame mass density  and isotropic pressure p. Real fluids are "sticky" and contain (and conduct) heat. Perfect fluids are idealized models in which these possibilities are neglected.  Specifically, perfect fluids have no shear stresses, viscosity, or heat conduction. Quark–gluon plasma is the closest known substance to a perfect fluid.

In space-positive metric signature tensor notation, the stress–energy tensor of a perfect fluid can be written in the form

where U is the 4-velocity vector field of the fluid and where  is the metric tensor of Minkowski spacetime.

In time-positive metric signature tensor notation, the stress–energy tensor of a perfect fluid can be written in the form

where U is the 4-velocity of the fluid and where  is the metric tensor of Minkowski spacetime.

This takes on a particularly simple form in the rest frame

Perfect fluids admit a Lagrangian formulation, which allows the techniques used in field theory, in particular, quantization, to be applied to fluids. 

Perfect fluids are used in general relativity to model idealized distributions of matter, such as the interior of a star or an isotropic universe. In the latter case, the equation of state of the perfect fluid may be used in Friedmann–Lemaître–Robertson–Walker equations to describe the evolution of the universe.

In general relativity, the expression for the stress–energy tensor of a perfect fluid is written as

where U is the 4-velocity vector field of the fluid and where  is the inverse metric, 
written with a space-positive signature.

See also
Equation of state
Ideal gas
Fluid solutions in general relativity
Potential flow

References
The Large Scale Structure of Space-Time, by S.W.Hawking and G.F.R.Ellis, Cambridge University Press, 1973. ,   (pbk.)

External links
Mark D. Roberts, [A Fluid Generalization of Membranes http://www.arXiv.org/abs/hep-th/0406164 hep-th/0406164].

Fluid mechanics
Superfluidity